This List of Electoral Districts in the Landtag of Brandenburg contains the current electoral districts for the fourth election period for the Landtag of Brandenburg as well as for the fifth election cycle in the Landtag of Brandenburg on September 27, 2009.

History 

Since the first Landtag Elections to the Landtag of Brandenburg on October 14, 1990 there existed 44 electoral districts with one direct mandate, which still included many list mandates. The former constituency boundaries are oriented to the districts and cities, that were accepted in the former DDR. In the outline of the Kreisreform Brandenburg 1993 many necessary changes were made but the number of electoral districts and mandates remained constant. The new version of the Brandenburg Election Laws (January 28, 2004) contained further modifications to the classifications of these area. Compared to the previous Landstag elections in 1999, new classifications reflected the changing population trends in various parts of the country and well as the changing Municipal boundaries. These areas remained the same during the Landstag Election of 2009.

The legal minimum of members in the Landstag is 88, so that, in addition to the 44 direct mandates, there would also be 44 members elected by a list mandate who would be awarded electoral districts. Though Overhang seats and Leveling Seats the number of members can increase to a maximum of 110 members.

Elector Districts With Area Descriptions

Changes to the Landtag elections in 2014 
There were some modifications to the electoral districts as a result of the Second law for changes to the constituency boundaries for the elections in the Landtag Brandenburg' (Zweite Gesetz zur Änderung der Wahlkreiseinteilung für die Wahl zum Landtag Brandenburg) which took effect on May 16, 2013:

 As the basis for the assisting in the enlargement of constituencies in the future, an electoral college will be used instead of a general vote count.
 The city of Velten will no longer belong to the Wahlkreis Oberhavel II and is now in the Wahlkreis Oberhavel I
 The Wahlkreis Potsdam-Mittelmark III/Potsdam III lost the area of Michendorf to the Wahlkreis Potsdam-Mittelmark II and gains Potsdamer Stadtteile Bornim, Bornstedt, Eiche, Golm, Grube, Nedlitz and Sacrow.
 The Wahlkreis Potsdam I includes the districts of Nördliche Innenstadt, Babelsberg, Klein Glienicke, Westliche Vorstädte and Nördliche Vorstädte.
 The Wahlkreis Potsdam II includes the districts of Drewitz, Kirchsteigfeld, Potsdam Süd, Stern and Südliche Innenstadt/Zentrum Ost

Further changes to community names were made and Golßener Land was removed and incorporated into Amy Unterspreewald. These changes were first applied in the 2014 Brandenburg Landstag Elections on September 14, 2014.

References 

Politics of Brandenburg
State legislatures of Germany